Trani, Apulia is a comune in Italy.

Trani may also refer to:

People
 Andrea Trani (born 1977), Italian yacht racer
 Barisano da Trani, Italian sculptor
 Bruno Trani (1928-2022), Italian sailor
 Eugene P. Trani (born 1939), American historian and educator
  (born 1963), Italian harpist
 Geoffrey of Trani (died 1245), Italian jurist
 Isaiah di Trani
 Isaiah di Trani the Younger
 John Trani, American executive
 Joseph Trani
 Leon Trani, Filipino boxer
 Luciano Trani (born 1966), Australian football player
 Peter I of Trani
 Peter II of Trani

Other
 
 Trani Cup
 U.S. Calcio Trani

See also